Mudaliyar (or Mudali) was a Ceylonese colonial title during Portugese and British rule of the island. Stemming from the native headman system, the title was usually hereditary, made to wealthy influential families loyal to the British Crown.

First used by Sinhalese kings and reigning princes from the Polonnaruwa period forward to ennoble subjects, the Portugese from 17th century onwards, followed by the Dutch and British continued use of the Mudaliyar title. The British use differed slightly in that they re-established a Mudaliyar class, at the behest of the Governor of Ceylon, with appointments that had the title of Mudali. This process was stopped in the 1930s when the Native Department of the British government of Ceylon was closed down.

The members of this group formed a unique social group called the Sri Lankan Mudaliyars and associated with older Radala caste. At present, the post of Court Mudliar remain in function in Sri Lankan courts.

History

Mudaliyar is a Tamil title, derived from the word mudhal, meaning "first", and the honorific suffix yar, meaning "The first" as in the person of the first rank. The position was created in the 17th century by the Portuguese to function as a link between the colonial administration and the local populace, as they had done in South India. Incumbents received payment in form of land grants and use of tenured service (Rajakariya) of the local population which they extracted for their own estates.

De Saram family
A De Saram family of Dutch and Malay ancestry had Sinhalised itself in the late 18th century by posing as the representatives of the masses and subsequently convincing the British rulers that they were from the numerous Govigama caste. This was a strategic move as it gave the British masters the impression that the De Saram family had the backing of a large body of natives. It was also the easiest route to Sinhalisation as the peasant community was widely dispersed, still unstructured, and without inter-community networks or leaders.
 
	
The first notable ancestor of the De Saram family was an interpreter who accompanied the Dutch Embassy to Kandy 1731–1732. Despite his advanced age of 71 years, this early De Saram had to make the entire journey by foot as his social status did not warrant travel in a palanquin. From there, the De Saram family progressively gained power and position by loyalty, switching religions from Dutch Protestantism to British Anglicanism and benefitting from the preference of British rulers to appoint individuals of unknown ancestry to high positions. By respectively collaborating with the Dutch and British rulers, the De Sarams succeeded in marginalizing the traditional ruling class. Governors Maitland (1805–1811), Gordon (1883–1890) and others effectively used divide and rule policies and created caste animosity among the native elite. The De Saram family eventually had a strong and exclusive network of relatives as Mudaliyars by the late 19th century.  Later, through marriage alliances, the network extended to the Obeyesekere, Dias-Bandaranaike, Ilangakoon, de Alwis, de Livera, Pieris, Siriwardena, and Senanayake families.

Ponnambalam-Coomaraswamy family

As much as the De Saram family was responsible for the rise of the Govigama caste, the Ponnambalam-Coomaraswamy Family was responsible for the 20th century, rise of the Tamil Vellalar caste. The ascendance of the Ponnambalam-Coomaraswamy family commences with a Coomaraswamy (1783–1836) from Point Pedro joining the seminary that Governor North started for producing interpreters. Coomaraswamy passed out and served as an interpreter from 1805. He was appointed by the Governor to a Mudaliyar position at the age of 26 and became the Jaffna Tamil with the highest government appointment. He played a critical role as the Tamil-English interpreter when the Kandyan king Sri Vikrama Rajasinha of Kandy was captured in 1815. He was rewarded by Governor Brownrigg in 1819 for loyal service to the British crown. There were allegations that he was not from the Vellala caste. James Rutnam's research has shown that Coomaraswamy's Father was Arumugampillai, a South Indian, who had migrated to Gurudavil in Jaffna. (Tribune 1957). 

Ponnambalam was appointed cashier of the Colombo Kachcheri in 1845 and deputy Coroner for Colombo in 1847. Many leading Englishmen were his friends and it transpired in the 1849 Parliamentary Commission that he used to lend money to government officials. His three sons P. Coomaraswamy (1849–1905), P. Ramanathan (1851–1930) and P. Arunachalam (1853–1926) became national figures. This closely related and endogamous clan emerged as the pre-eminent Tamil family of the country and rose to national elite status. Despite their Anglicized background which propelled their rise, the family presented a staunch Hindu appearance and assumed the role of 'Patrons of the Vellalas in Colombo. However many of its members; Muttu Coomaraswamy, P. Coomaraswamy, P. Ramanathan married western women. Ananda Coomaraswamy was married four times to western women. They helped many young Tamils to secure employment in English Banks and Mercantile establishments. On the death of Mudaliyar Coomaraswamy's wife in 1897, the leading daily, 'The Ceylon Independent' wrote " to her and her husband, almost every important Hindu family in the city owes its rise".

Titular Mudaliyars
In 1853, the British Governor George William Anderson appointed Jeronis de Soysa, a successful merchant who had undertaken a great deal of philanthropy as a Gate Mudaliyar as an honour in recognition of his philanthropic en-devours. From this point, the Governors made Mudaliyar appointments as titular honours to individuals outside the government service. This practice continued past the discontinuation of the native headman system in 1937 and into the post-independence era until S. W. R. D. Bandaranaike suspended state honours in 1956.

Ranks of British Mudaliyars
Mudaliyars had several classes, of which the official and ex-offico were government servants, whilst the titular'' was awarded as an honour.
The order of precedence 
Maha Mudaliyar
Gate Mudaliyar (Wasala Mudaliyar)
Atapattu Mudaliyar
Kachcheri Mudaliyar
Korale Mudaliyar
Court Mudaliyar

Official 
Maha Mudaliar (Head Mudaliyar) - head of the native headmen of the low country and native aide-de-camp of the governor.
Mudaliar of the Atapattu - in charge of jurisdiction of a District or Area
Mudaliar of the Korale – in charge of jurisdiction of a korale

Awarded as an honour (Titular)
Mudaliar of the Governor's Gate (Gate Mudaliar) (Titular) – awarded as an honour 
Mudaliar (Titular) – awarded as an honour

Ex-officio 
Mudaliar of the Kachcheri – head of the native staff of a Kachcheri
Court Mudaliar-Court Clerk/Court Interpreter
Heads of minor departments of public service held the rank of Mudaliar by virtue of their office.

List of prominent Mudaliyars

Maha Mudaliyar (Head Mudaliyar)
 Maha Mudaliyar Nicholas Dias Abeyesinghe Amarasekere (1719–1794)- Head Mudaliyar of Dutch Ceylon
 Maha Mudaliyar Christoffel de Saram Wanigasekera Ekanaike (1765–1842) 
 Maha Mudaliyar Kaluhath Samson De Abrew Wijeyagooneratne Rajapakshe (1831-1888)
 Maha Mudaliyar Edmund Rowland Gooneratne (1845–1914) – Acting Maha Mudaliyar and formerly Gate Mudaliyar and Atapattu Mudaliyar of Galle
 Maha Mudaliyar Sir Solomon Dias Bandaranike (1862–1946) – Head Mudaliyar
 Maha Mudaliyar Sir James Peter Obeyesekere II (1879–1968) – last Maha Mudliyar

Gate Mudaliyar
 Gate Mudaliyar Arumugampillai Coomaraswamy (1784–1836) of Point Pedro
 Gate Mudaliyar Jeronis de Soysa Dissanayake (1797–1862) – First Gate Mudaliyar outside of government service
 Gate Mudaliyar Arunachalam Ponnambalam (1814–1887) of Manipay
 Gate Mudaliyar James Edward Corea (1865– 1955) of Chilaw
 Gate Mudaliyar Alexander Edmund De Silva Wijegooneratne Samaraweera Rajapakse, OBE (1866–1937) of Negombo
 Gate Mudaliyar Abraham Mendis Gunasekera (1869–1931)
 Gate Mudaliyar Edmund Peiris, JP, UM of Kalutara
 Gate Mudaliyar A. C. G. S. Amarasekara, OBE (1883 – 1983)
 Gate Mudaliyar Baba Hakim Muthaliph (1779–1839) of Magampattuwa
 Gate Mudaliyar Baba Thajul Arifin Doole (1834–1909) of Hambantota
 Gate Mudaliyar Muhammad Samsudeen Kariapper (1899–1989) of Akkaraipattu
 Gate Mudaliyar Manueltamby St. John Puvirajasinghe of Karaiyur, Jaffna.
 Gate Mudaliyar Don Gabriell Kumarasinghe Jayakody (1871-1951) of Jayakody Walawwa - Ganemulla 
 Gate Mudaliyar Tuder Dedrick Nathaniel De Abrew Wijeyagooneratne Samaraweera Rajapakse (1867-1959) of Maha Kappina Walawwa - Balapitiya

Mudaliyar
 Mudaliyar Deraniyagala Louis Pieris Samarasinghe Siriwardena (1680–1746)
 Mudaliyar Deogo Kurukulasuriya Arasunilayitta of Karaiyur, Jaffna (1790s) .
 Mudaliyar Yakunduwe Dharmasena Hitiralalage Don Richard Perera Wimalasekara (Honorable)(1750s) Waskadu Badda Pothupitiya Pattikarawasala Walauwa 
Mudliyar Dharmasena Hitiralalage Don Devid Perera wimalasekara (1805-1860s)(Honorable) Waskadubadda Pothupitiya Pattikarawasala Walauwa
 Mudaliyar Don Spater Senanayake (1848–1907) of Botale
 Mudaliyar John De Silva Wijegooneratne Rajapakshe, J.P. (1841-1909) of Negombo
 Mudaliyar Ahamath Ibrahim Jainu-Deen (1864–1924) of Badulla
 Mudaliyar Sinathamby Somasundara Aiyer (1881–1953) of Punnalaikkadduvan
 Mudliyar Nanayakkara Rajawasala Appuhamilage Don Arthur de Silva Wijesinghe Siriwardena (1889–1947) of Richmond Castle, Kalutara
 Mudaliyar Aboobucker of Galle
 Mudaliyar Ahamed Lebbe Sinne Lebbe (b 1902) of Batticaloa
 Mudaliyar Don Peiris Weerasinghe – of Nugegoda
 Mudaliyar Shanmugam Tambyah Mudaliyar of Manipay
 Mudaliyar Richard Jayawickrama Wijetunga of Elgiriya
 Mudaliyar Jayasena Madanayake of Peliyagoda
 Mudaliyar Baba Junoor Haji Bahar
 Mudaliyar Komanda Mudali of Kandy
 Mudaliyar Thenahandi David Mendis of Negombo (1904–1977)
 Mudaliyar Kanaharaaya of Karaveddy, Jaffna.
 Mudaliyar William Mohotti Munasinghe, Aide-de-camp to the British Governor and Mudaliyar of Negombo (1902-1962)  
 Chief Mudaliyar Sheikh Abdul Cader Marikar Muhammad Cassim Lebbe Marikar (1805–1877) – Chief Mudaliyar Eastern Province

See also
Kastane
Muhandiram
Native headmen of Ceylon
Radala
Raja of Chettinad
Rao Bahadur
Walauwa

Further reading

References

 
M
Titles in Sri Lanka
Defunct government positions in Sri Lanka